Euthima araujoi is a species of beetle in the family Cerambycidae. It was described by Martins in 1979. It is known from Brazil.

References

Onciderini
Beetles described in 1979